Tôn Đức Lượng (born 1925 in Bắc Ninh) is a Vietnamese painter. He studied at the École des Beaux Arts de l'Indochine in the class of 1944–1945. together with other famous painters such as Phan Kế An, Dương Bích Liên, Nguyễn Địch Dũng, Trần Quốc Ân. He worked for Tien Phong newspaper during the First Indochina War and was officially in charge of illustrations from 1957 to 1982.

References

Bibliography
Lý Trực Dũng (2010). Biếm họa Việt Nam. Hanoi: NXB Mỹ Thuật.

20th-century Vietnamese painters
1925 births
Living people